Ambrose Arnold Ranney (April 17, 1821 – March 5, 1899) was a Representative from Massachusetts.

Early life
Ambrose Arnold Ranney was born on April 17, 1821, in Townshend, Vermont. He graduated from Dartmouth College and studied law in Woodstock, Vermont in 1844. In 1848, he was admitted to the bar and practiced in Boston.

Career
Ranney was in the corporation counsel for the city from 1855 to 1857. He was a member of the Massachusetts House of Representatives in 1857, 1863, and 1864 and served as a Republican in the Forty-seventh, Forty-eighth, and Forty-ninth Congresses (1881–1887). Ranney supported women’s suffrage. He failed reelection in 1886 to the Fiftieth Congress. He then resumed the practice of law until his death.

Personal life
Ranney died in Boston on March 5, 1899. Ranney was buried at Forest Hills Cemetery in Boston.

References

External links

 

Republican Party members of the Massachusetts House of Representatives
Republican Party members of the United States House of Representatives from Massachusetts
People from South End, Boston
Dartmouth College alumni
19th-century American politicians
1821 births
1899 deaths